Chungathara is a village panchayat in Nilambur Taluk in Malappuram district, Kerala, India.  It is one of the smallest gramapnachayat in Kerala.  It is surrounded by Western Ghats.

Geography
Two rivers, Chaliyar and Punnappuzha, pass through this village.

Transportation
The Nilambur - Ooty road passes through Chungathara.  Nearby townships are Edakkara and Nilambur. Nilambur is 7 km away.
Long distance Such as Kozhikode, Malappuram, Tirur, Thrissur, Ernakulam, Trivandrum, Kottayam, Mysore, Gudallur, Kalpetta, Wayanad, Bangalore, Ootty buses pass through the town.
The nearest airport is Calicut International Airport in Malappuram.

Demographics
Majority of the population are migrants from Travancore region of Kerala in the 1960s and 1970s.  Chungathara has the largest number of Christians in the Malappuram district.  The majority are farmers and rubber is a major cash crop.  Many residents work abroad, mainly in Middle East countries. Chungathara is a well known town and merged with Edakkara and Nilambur urban locality. 
Erumamunda, Kurumbalangode, Pallikkuth, Mampoyil, Kaippini, Palayakode etc. are the other parts of Chungathara panchayath.

Education
 Mar Thoma College, Chungathara
Marthoma College is an education institution and situated in the heart of the city. Started in 1981, Rt. Rev. Easow Mar Thimatheous Episcopa was the founder, and Dr. Raina Thomas is the current principal. At present almost all the post-graduate courses are available, which is very helpful for students coming from villages near to this college.

Major schools
 Marthoma Higher Secondary School, Chungathara
 Mar Philoxenos Memorial Higher Secondary School, Chungathara
 Islamic Charity Centre English Medium School, Erumamunda
 Good Shepherd Modern English School, Palunda
 Nirmala Higher Secondary School, Erumamunda
 ALP School, Konnamanna (Achen's Memorial School) is an aided school nearby Chungathara
 MGM English Medium School, Chungathara
 ALP School Pookkottumannu
 ALP School, Mundapadam, Kurumbalangode
 Carmelgiri School, Thalanji

Churches
 Salem Marthoma Church, Chungathara
 St. George Orthodox ValiyaPally, Chungathara
 St. Thomas Orthodox Church, Chalikkapotty, Chungathara
 St. George Malankara Catholic Church, Chungathara
 Indian Pentecostal Church (IPC) Chungathara
 St.Marys Church, Thalanji, Chungathara
 St. George Malankara Catholic Church, Myladumpotty
 Assemblies Of God Church (AG) Chungathara
 St.Thomas Jacobite Syrian church Erumamunda
 Mar Basil cheriya palli Erumamunda
 St.marys Malankara catholic church Chungathara

Mosques

 Mujahid Masjid, Chungathara Town
 Sunni grand Masjid, Chungathara
 Busstand Masjid
 Sunni Juma Masjid, Mundamoola
 Mujahid Masjid, Kaippini

Temples
 Nedumpuzha Devi Temple
 Sree Narayana Guru Temple
 Kurathiyamma Devi Temple, Pathirippadam
 Mannathi Siva Temple
 Kunnath Varahamoorthy Temple

Nearest Railway Station

Nilambur Railway
https://www.google.co.in/maps/dir/Nilambur+Railway+Station,+Railway+Station+Road,+Nilambur,+Kerala/

See also
 Vazhikkadavu
 Nilambur
 Edakkara
 Gudalur
 Mango Orange
 Pandalur
 Devala, Nilgris

Transportation
Chaungathara connects to other parts of India through Nilambur.  State Highway No. 28 starts in Nilambur and connects to Ooty, Mysore and Bangalore through Highways. 12, 29 and 181. National Highway No. 66 passes through Ramanattukara and the northern stretch connects to Goa and Mumbai.  The southern stretch connects to Cochin and Trivandrum State.  The nearest airport is at Kozhikode.  The nearest major railway station is at Feroke.

Image Gallery

References

External links 
 http://lsgkerala.in/chungatharapanchayat/

Villages in Malappuram district
Cities and towns in Malappuram district
Nilambur area